NBPC may refer to:

National Basketball Performance Centre, a sports centre in Manchester, England
National Black Playwrights Conference, a conference held in Canberra, Australia, in 1987
National Border Patrol Council, an American labour union
Provincial Court of New Brunswick, the  lower trial court of the Canadian province of New Brunswick